Thomas de Fréauville (Thomas de Freauvilla) was a bishop of Bayeux of the 13th century.

Thomas was the son of Rogo and Berta, from a noble family established in Rouen. Michael, a canon of the cathedral could be a relative.

Archdeacon of Bayeux in 1221, he became dean of the chapter of the cathedral of Rouen in 1225, titulature that he kept until 1231..

The chapter of Rouen Cathedral proceeds in 1229 to the election of a new archbishop, following the death of Thibaut of Amiens. Part of the chapter elected him, while the other chose Maurice, bishop of Le Mans. After appeal to the Holy See and the appointment on May 4, 1230 of two investigators, Adam de Chambly, the bishop of Senlis and Jean de Montmirail, the election is broken. Thomas renounced his rights and Gregory IX transferred Maurice du Mans to Rouen in 1231.

He became archdeacon of Amiens in 1231 and acceded to the bishopric of Bayeux in 1233. following the death of Robert des Ablèges in 1231. He remained bishop until 1238 and died in 1239.

References 

Year of birth missing
1239 deaths
Roman Catholic bishops in France
Bayeux